Azeddine Habz (born 19 July 1993) is a French middle- and long-distance runner. He won the bronze medal in the 1500 metres at the 2023 European Indoor Championships.

Personal life
Habz was brought up in Morocco before relocating to France in 2012. He received French citizenship and began representing France in August 2018. He studied sociology at the University of Paris.

Career
In October 2018, Habz became the French half marathon champion. On 29 February 2020, he won the 3000 metres at the French Indoor Championships in a time of 7:57.20. He was selected to run for France at the delayed 2020 Summer Olympics in Tokyo in the 1500 metres race.

Achievements

International competitions

Personal bests
 800 metres – 1:46.20 (Decines 2021)
 1500 metres – 3:31.74 (Monaco 2021)
 1500 metres indoor – 3:35.59 (Toruń 2023)
 2000 metres indoor – 4:57.22 (Liévin 2022) 
 3000 metres indoor – 7:43.33 (New York, NY 2022)
 5000 metres – 13:38.00 (Oordegem, Lede 2019)
Road
 5 kilometres – 13:43 (Monaco 2020)
 10 kilometres – 28:24 (Valencia 2022)
 Half marathon – 1:04:53 (Ústí nad Labem 2020)

National titles
 French Athletics Championships
 1500 metres: 2022
 French Indoor Athletics Championships
 1500 metres: 2022, 2023
 3000 metres: 2020
 French Cross Country Championships: 2018, 2023
  French Half Marathon Championships: 2018

References

External links
 

1993 births
Living people
French male middle-distance runners
French male long-distance runners
Olympic athletes of France
Athletes (track and field) at the 2020 Summer Olympics
Moroccan emigrants to France
Naturalized citizens of France
French sportspeople of Moroccan descent
Mediterranean Games gold medalists for France
Athletes (track and field) at the 2022 Mediterranean Games
Mediterranean Games gold medalists in athletics
21st-century French people